Overstrand Cliffs is a  biological and geological Site of Special Scientific Interest in Cromer in Norfolk. It is a  Special Area of Conservation and part of it is a Geological Conservation Review site. 

These soft cliffs are subject to falls and slumping, providing a habitat for species associated with disturbance such as the rare beetles Bledius filipes, Harpalus vernalis and Nebria livida. The cliff is geologically important for its succession of Pleistocene glacial exposures.

The beach is open to the public.

References

Sites of Special Scientific Interest in Norfolk
Geological Conservation Review sites